The Kinta Valley is a conurbation in central Perak, Malaysia, surrounding and including the state capital Ipoh. Historically the Kinta Valley was very rich in tin, and their mines have been among the most productive in the world.
The valley is formed by the Kinta River, a tributary of Sungai Perak, which flows between the Main Range and the Kledang Range.
It forms the largest tin field along the Siamese-Malayan peninsula tin belt. It has been mined since ancient times by indigenous peoples but more intensively mined by the Chinese and Europeans since the end of the nineteenth century. Today, the modern Kinta district is one of the ten administrative districts of Perak. In 2018, the valley  was declared Malaysia's second national geopark.

Geographical definition
The Kinta Valley consists of the city of Ipoh and the municipality of Batu Gajah in the Kinta District and also the towns of Gopeng and Kampar in Kampar district. 

It borders the town of Sungai Siput located in the Kuala Kangsar District to the north, Parit (Central Perak region) to the west, the Batang Padang valley to the south, and Lojing (Kelantan) and Cameron Highlands (Pahang) to the east.

Politics
The Kinta Valley covers the parliamentary constituencies of Ipoh West and East, Tambun, Batu Gajah, Gopeng and Kampar.

Local government in the Kinta Valley includes, from north to south:
 Ipoh City Council (Majlis Bandaraya Ipoh, MBI), covering Ipoh city, Chemor, Manjoi and Ulu Kinta.
 Batu Gajah District Council (Majlis Daerah Batu Gajah, MDBG), covering Batu Gajah town, Simpang Pulai and the Cameron Highlands road.
 Kampar District Council (Majlis Daerah Kampar, MDKpr), covering Kampar town and Gopeng.

History
The Kinta Valley was occupied for thousands of years by the ancestors of the Orang Asli. Prehistoric remains include the Tambun rock art. The Kinta Valley has been visited for tin by Indian traders since ancient times. Buddhist bronze artefacts have been excavated in Kinta in 1931.

Mining

Early mining methods
An early method of indigenous mining was the Lombong Siam, meaning Siamese mines. Malay miners used ground sluicing or the lampan method by cutting ditches from the nearest river. In the nineteenth century, Mandailing migrants from Sumatra were observed using the tabuk mine, which is an excavated pit from which water is removed by cantilevered baskets.

Chinese mining
The first tin rush to Kinta lasted from 1884 to 1889 where new land was taken up by Chinese miners using labour-intensive methods. Hailing from the farmlands of Guangdong, the Chinese mining workers at first used agricultural implements such as hoes, rakes and baskets to excavate the earth. The Chinese also introduced the water wheel to dewater the mines. The second tin rush lasted from 1889 to 1895, and was characterised by small gangs of tributers using the wooden sluice box (lanchut kechil). Around the turn of the twentieth century, two of the most famous large Chinese mines were the Tambun Mines, owned by Leong Fee, and Tronoh Mines, owned by Foo Choo Choon.  There were many successful Chinese miners too like Eu Tong Sen, Chop Thai Lee, Chung Thye Phin, Au Moh Yi, Yau Tet Shin, Khi Ho Nin, Shak Yin Fuk, Lam Look Ing and Aw Kong. Up till the late twentieth century, Chinese women miners could be commonly observed panning tin with wooden trays (dulang) from stream-beds and tailing dumps of tin mines.

European mining
The longest operating European mine in the Kinta Valley was the French Société des Etains de Kinta better known as SEK, which started operating in 1886 and only closed down in 1985. Foo Choo Choon's Tronoh Mines was floated in London and became a European concern. Several opportunities arose for Osborne, founder of the Gopeng tin mining Company, who expanded his business by forming the famous professional partnership of Osborne & Chappell in 1901.

Dredging
In 1913, dredging was put into practice by Malayan Tin Dredging Ltd. (MTD), which later became the largest tin dredging company in the world. It had a significant impact on Kinta in terms of technological advancement. The bucket dredge was introduced and was the final breakthrough of the Malayan tin mining industry.

The last surviving dredge can be found at Batu Gajah along Jalan Tanjung Tualang. It belongs to Southern Malaya Tin Dredging.

See also
 Kinta Valley National Geopark
 Klang Valley
 Geography of Malaysia

References

External links

Geography of Perak
Valleys of Malaysia
Geoparks in Malaysia